Jonathan Creek is a stream in the U.S. state of Ohio.

Jonathan Creek was named for Jonathan Zane, brother of Ebenezer Zane, a pioneer who became lost and camped out the night there.

See also
List of rivers of Ohio

References

Rivers of Muskingum County, Ohio
Rivers of Perry County, Ohio
Rivers of Ohio